Rago may refer to:

Places 
 Rago, Arkansas, United States
 Rago, Colorado, United States
 Rago, Kansas, United States
 Rago National Park, Norway

People 
 Antonio Rago (born 1990), Canadian soccer player
 Henry Rago (1915–1969), American poet
 Joseph Rago (1983–2017), Wall Street Journal writer
 Pablo Rago (born 1972), Argentine actor